Zain-ud-Din Khan known as Zain Khan Sirhindi (died 1764) was the Mughal Faujdar of Sirhind, he was a serviceman of Shah Alam II, an ally of Najib-ud-Daula and Ahmad Shah Durrani. Zain Khan Sirhindi fought during the Third Battle of Panipat and strengthened Mughal rule in the region.

Biography 
Zain Khan was sipahsalar and a great noble at the court of Ahmed Shah Durrani. After the conquest of Delhi by that monarch , he held the subahdarship of Sirhind.

In Ahmad Shah Durrani's reign, Zain Khan, one of the leading men in the Mohmand tribe and the ancestor of the Morcha Khel section, was recognized as Khan of Lalpura, and had 12 villages made over to him .Zain Khan however soon grew notorious for plundering villages within his own territory aswell as refusing to pay his own soldiers.Tahmas Khan was disgusted by Zain Khan's actions and he soon left his services and perdicted that Zain Khan along with the city of Sirhind would fall.

In January 1764, Ahmad Shah Durrani led his sixth expedition to assist Sadat Yar Khan of Doab and Zain Khan Sirhindi and his Mughal Army which was later overrun outside Sirhind, by 36,000 Sikh rebels led by Jassa Singh Ahluwalia, who plundered Lahore and the upper Doab.

Death
Zain Khan Sirhindi was defeated and killed by the Sikhs in the Battle of Sirhind (1764).

Descendants
Zain Khan was originally from the Khan Khel (family) of Lalpura Mohmands. His direct descendants are traced in the book "The Mohmands" by W. R. H. Merk. Most influential of them are the ones descended from the four sons of Nauroz Khan, who migrated to Peshawar.

See also
Shah Alam II

References

5.  The Sikh Encyclopedia

6.  A Glossary of the Tribes and Castes of the Punjab and North-West ..., Volume 3 Page 126

7.  W R H Merk - "The Mohmands"

8.  Captain E.G.G. Hastings - Page 112 of Report of the regular settlement of the Peshawar district of the Punjab 1878

9.  State and Tribe in Nineteenth-Century Afghanistan

10.  Hari Ram Gupta - Page 168 of History of the Sikhs: Evolution of Sikh confederacies, 1708-1769 (3rd rev. ed. 1978)

Mughal soldiers
Indian warriors
18th-century Indian Muslims
Indian military personnel
People from Fatehgarh Sahib district